Kisses for Everyone is a 2000 Spanish comedy film with drama elements directed by Jaime Chávarri. The cast features Emma Suárez, Eloy Azorín, Roberto Hoyas, Chusa Barbero, Iñaki Font and Pilar López de Ayala, among others.

Plot 
Set in 1965 Spain, during the Francoist dictatorship, a trio of privileged male medical students (Ramón, Alfonso and Nicolás) are sent to a house in the province of Cádiz so they prepare for their final exams. Yet instead of studying, debauchery, partying and sex ensue after they meet Vicky and Marian, part-time dancers, part-time hookers.

Cast

Production 
The screenplay was penned by José Ángel Esteban and Carlos López based on the  experiences as a medicine student. Produced by Sogecine, the film was shot in Cádiz.

Release 
The film opened in theatres on 1 December 2000.

Accolades 

|-
| align = "center" rowspan = "7" | 2001 || rowspan = "6" | 15th Goya Awards || Best Director || Jaime Chávarri ||  || rowspan = "6" | 
|-
| Best Supporting Actress || Chusa Barbero ||  
|-
| Best New Actress || Pilar López de Ayala || 
|-
| Best Art Direction || Fernando Sáenz, Ulía Loureiro || 
|-
| Best Makeup and Hairstyles || Romana González, Josefa Morales || 
|-
| Best Costume Design || Pedro Moreno || 
|-
| 10th Actors and Actresses Union Awards || Best Newcomer || Pilar López de Ayala ||  || 
|}

See also 
 List of Spanish films of 2000

References 

2000 films
Spanish comedy films
Films set in Andalusia
Films shot in the province of Cádiz
2000 comedy films
2000s Spanish-language films
Sogecine films
Films directed by Jaime Chávarri
2000s Spanish films